Donald McDonald may refer to:

Politicians
Donald McDonald (Province of Canada politician), birth and death dates unknown
Donald McDonald (Ontario politician) (1816–1879), member of the Canadian Senate, 1867–1879
Donald A. McDonald (1833–1906), Wisconsin steamboat builder and legislator
Donald Robert McDonald (1856–1923), Canadian contractor and politician
Donald H. McDonald (1867–1928), Canadian politician, member of the Legislative Assembly of Northwest Territories, 1896–1905
Donald Cromwell McDonald (1879–1917), Manitoba politician

Others
Donald McDonald (ABC chairperson) (born 1938), chair of the Australian Broadcasting Corporation
Donald McDonald (footballer) (born 1962), Australian rules footballer and coach

See also
Donald MacDonald (disambiguation)
Ronald MacDonald (disambiguation)
Ronald McDonald (disambiguation)
Ronald McDonald